Khardun (also Romanized as Khārdūn; also known as Khāfkūh and Khārdān) is a village in Sarduiyeh Rural District, Sarduiyeh District, Jiroft County, Kerman Province, Iran. As of the 2006 census, its population was 119, with there being 20 families.

References 

Populated places in Jiroft County